Maurizio Sparagnini (1706- 1748) was an Italian painter active in a late-Baroque style, active in the Marche.

Biography
He was born in Urbania, although described in some sources as a Durantino, and died in Urbino. He painted a St Benedetto da Norcia invia Mauro in Francia, a San Placido, and a Madonna and Child for the church of Santa Maria Maddalena in Urbania.

References

1706 births
1748 deaths
People from the Province of Pesaro and Urbino
18th-century Italian painters
Italian male painters
Italian Baroque painters
18th-century Italian male artists